The Indian Federal Democratic Party was a political party in India. In the 2004 Lok Sabha elections IFDP won one seat from Kerala P. C. Thomas Defeating Jose K. Mani of Kerala Congress (M). That was the first parliamentary electoral victory of a National Democratic Alliance member in the state.

On 2005, IFDP merged with the Kerala Congress of P.J Joseph. A breakaway faction of IFDP led by M. P. George split from the party. In 2014, this faction  merged with All India Forward Bloc.

References

Defunct political parties in India
Former member parties of the National Democratic Alliance
Political parties with year of disestablishment missing
Political parties with year of establishment missing